List of locomotives of Rhodesia Railways, 80–90 of which went to Zambia Railways in 1967. Rhodesia Railways became National Railways of Zimbabwe in 1980.

Steam

Diesel

Electric

References

Further reading

Rhodesia